The first skyscrapers in Russia were built during the Stalinist Era in the Soviet Union. These skyscrapers are known as the Seven Sisters, which were built in the Stalinist architectural style. The first skyscraper to be constructed in Russia was the Kotelnicheskaya Embankment Building. Skyscrapers in Russia are among the tallest in Europe and the Eastern Hemisphere, the vast majority of them are located in the MIBC, in the nation's capital of Moscow, which is home to 7 out of the 10 tallest skyscrapers in Europe.

It is followed by four skyscrapers in the MIBC, Federation Tower Vostok (or "East"), OKO, Neva Tower 2, and Mercury City Tower, the tallest buildings in both Russia and Europe.

Russia is currently going through a skyscraper construction boom; with multiple skyscrapers under construction and planned. It is the first European nation with over roughly 300 skyscrapers completed over 100 metres.

The list does not include Ostankino Tower (540 m), the tallest free-standing structure in Russia and Europe. For these kind of buildings, see List of tallest structures built in the Soviet Union.

Tallest buildings 
This includes all architectural details as well as antenna spires.

Tallest buildings proposed, approved, or under construction

Under Construction

Timeline of tallest buildings 
This is a list of the history of the tallest buildings in Russia; it includes buildings that once held the title of tallest building in Russia.

See also
List of tallest Orthodox churches
List of tallest buildings in Europe
Ostankino Tower

References

External links
The Skyscraper Center, Council on Tall Buildings and Urban Habitat (CTBUH)
Moscow Tower
Naberezhnaya Tower C
Triumph-Palace
Capital City St. Petersburg Tower
Zapad/Federation Tower West